The Registered Professional Accountant (RPA) is a Canadian accounting designation granted by the Society of Professional Accountants of Canada (SPAC), a federally chartered non profit organization. The designation requires completion of university or college courses set by SPAC and passing four Mandatory Professional Exams (MPE): Financial Accounting, Management Accounting, Taxation, and Data Analytics and Technology.  The Registered Professional Accountant has five pathways to designation, making it an accessible choice for accounting students.

The Registered Professional Accountant designation is different from the Chartered Professional Accountant (CPA) designation in that RPA’s are small to medium sized business focused in their scope, and perform CSRS 4200 Compilation year-end financial reporting, income tax, and related bookkeeping services for their corporate clients, whereas the Chartered Professional Accountants perform similar services for larger entities along with assurance reports (Audit and Review engagements).  

A Chartered Professional Accountant (CPA) may apply for an RPA designation. A CPA in good standing will not have to write the MPE exams.  In addition, a CPA with a practice certificate can transfer their practice certificate to be an RPA practitioner.

An RPA member must complete the Professional Practice Certification (PPC) program offered by the Society and apply for the Certified Accounting Practitioner (CAP) certification to start their professional accounting practice. 

An RPA with a CAP Certification is trained and qualified to issue compilation engagement reports following the new Canadian Standards for Related Services (CSRS 4200) issued by the Auditing & Assurance Standards Board (AASB), and to provide related services such as: filing personal and corporate tax returns, performing bookkeeping and accounting services, business consulting, technology, and data analytics.

RPA members without a Certified Accounting Practitioner (CAP) certification serve employers in small, medium, and large corporations, or the public service, in management accounting and related services, or working as an entrepreneur in different leadership roles in a variety of businesses. 

In addition to performing Compilation Engagement Reports under Canadian Standards for Related Services 4200, the RPA qualifies to act as a Canadian Passport Guarantor.

In terms of global outreach and work in conjunction with international accounting bodies, Registered Professional Accountants (RPA) are recognized for admission as an associate member to the Institute of Certified Management Accountants (CMA) Australia, the Certified General Accountants of Pakistan (CGA), and the Zambia Institute of Chartered Accountants  through mutual recognition agreements in place with RPA Canada.  RPA's are also eligible to write the Forensic Certified Public Accountant exam offered by the Forensic CPA Society in the state of Washington, USA. 

The RPA designation is recognized by the Ontario Government, Civil Service; Ontario Ministry of Education and Training; and Management Board of Ontario for employment purposes.  

In addition, RPA's in Ontario along with CPA's (Chartered Professional Accountants), Lawyers, and Paralegals are exclusively recognized and designated by the province as Official Intermediary Professional Organizations permitted to transact as intermediary organizations on behalf of business clients for the various corporate filings available on the Ontario Business Registry using the provincial portal.  

An RPA with the Certified Accounting Practitioner certification can also apply as a Commissioner for Taking Affidavits with The Office of the Attorney General of Ontario. 

Vision:

The Society of Professional Accountants of Canada aspires to be the perpetually relevant National Professional Accounting body for local businesses by ensuring consistent excellence in both service delivery and ethical standards while inspiring commitment and active support for the communities in which our Members practice.

Pathways to RPA Designation:

College Pathway,
 Students with a College Diploma in Accounting and two years experience working in the accounting field will need the RPA Prerequisite Courses and to take the MPE Review Sessions, once these are complete students may apply to write the Mandatory Professional Exams (MPE) in Financial Accounting, Management Accounting, Taxation, and Data Analytics to earn the RPA Designation.

University Pathway
 Students with a University Degree in Accounting and two years experience working in the accounting field may take the MPE Review Sessions and apply to write the Mandatory Professional Exams (MPE) in Financial Accounting, Management Accounting, Taxation, and Data Analytics to earn the RPA Designation.

Mature Student - Bookkeeper Practitioner Pathway
 Mature students that have been operating their own practice as a bookkeeper for 5 years may take the RPA Prescribed Courses (Financial Accounting, Management Accounting, Canadian Business Law, Ethics, Canadian Income Tax I & II, and Data Analytics), and the MPE Review Sessions.  Following these courses they may apply to write the Mandatory Professional Exams (MPE) in Financial Accounting, Management Accounting, Taxation, and Data Analytics to earn the RPA Designation.

Mature Student - Undesignated Accounting Practitioner Pathway
 Mature students that have been operating their own practice as an undesignated accountant for 5 or more years may take the MPE Review Sessions and write a fast-track consolidated Mandatory Professional Exam combining Financial Accounting, Management Accounting, Income Taxation, and Data Analytics to earn the RPA Designation.  Following this, the fast-track program requires these members to complete Canadian Income Taxation I & II, Ethics, Canadian Business Law, and Data Analytics courses within one year of admission as an RPA.

Foreign Designated Accountant Pathway
 Holders of recognized foreign accounting designations and with two years experience working in the accounting field may be granted the RPA designation and must complete Canadian Taxation I & II, Canadian Business Law, and Data Analytics courses within 18 months following admission as an RPA.

Professional Practice Certification (PPC) and the Certified Accounting Practitioner Program (CAP):

RPA's that complete the Certified Accounting Practitioner program will become a Certified Accounting Practitioner (CAP) and receive a Professional Practice Certificate (PPC) valid for a period of 5 years, after which time the certification must be renewed.  

The CAP certification allows an RPA member to provide professional accounting services as an RPA practitioner for their clients.  

These members operate accounting firms providing CSRS 4200 Compilation Year End Reports, Corporate T2 Tax filing, Bookkeeping and Related Professional Services.

The Certified Accounting Practitioner (CAP program) consists of an eight module course followed by two case study assignments (Case Study A and Case Study B), and an examination.  After successful completion of the CAP program, the RPA member is certified through the society to operate their accounting practice.

Academic Partners:

 McMaster University
 Sheridan College 
 Durham College
 Georgian College

RPA Prerequisite Courses:

 Entry Level
Intermediate Financial Accounting I	
Introductory Management Accounting	
Management Information Systems	
Ethics in Workplace Skills	

 Technician
Intermediate Financial Accounting II 	
Intermediate Management Accounting	
Taxation I 	
Financial Management	

 Professional	 
Financial Reporting
Taxation II	
Analytics and Big Data 	
Business Law	

 Applied	 
Audit and Internal Controls	
Accounting Systems  	
Data Analytics for Accountants	
Emerging Trends in Fintech	

History

The Canadian Institute of Accredited Public Accountants (CIAPA) was founded in 1938 and was granted letters patent under the provisions of Part II of the Canada Corporation Act on May 7, 1946. The Society of Professional Accountants of Canada (SPAC) was established in 1978. A Federal Charter was granted to the Society as a Corporation by letters patent under the Provision of Part II of the Canada Corporations Act. The CIAPA is the oldest accounting institution in Canada, and is now under the control of the Society.

See also
 Chartered Professional Accountant

References

External links
 Official website
 Sheridan College RPA Pathway
 McMaster University RPA Pathway
 RPA Learning (McGraw Hill Partnership)

Canadian accounting associations